The Nephi Main Post Office, at 10 N. Main in Nephi, Utah, was built in 1933.  It was listed on the National Register of Historic Places as US Post Office-Nephi Main in 1989.

Its design is credited to James A. Wetmore, then the acting U.S. Supervising Architect.

References

Post office buildings on the National Register of Historic Places in Utah
National Register of Historic Places in Juab County, Utah
Buildings and structures completed in 1933